Karaadilli is a town (belde) and municipality in the Şuhut District, Afyonkarahisar Province, Turkey. Its population is 2,224 (2021).

References

Şuhut District
Populated places in Afyonkarahisar Province
Towns in Turkey